William A. Karges Fine Art is an art gallery at Dolores St. and 6th Ave in Carmel, California, United States.

History and development
William A. Karges Fine Art was founded in 1987 by William A. Karges. A former collector of European antiques and objets d’art, he entered the art business after discovering the books Plein Air Painters of California: The North and Plein Air Painters of California: The Southland. After developing his expertise on the subject by seeking out works held in public and private collections throughout California, he eventually established a gallery that focuses primarily on historically important, museum quality paintings executed by California artists between 1870 and 1950. In addition to an emphasis on California Impressionism, William A. Karges Fine Art is active in the secondary market for works from the Hudson River School, Bay Area Figurative, and many other American artists and styles including Modern, Abstract, Northwest, and Southwest art. William A. Karges Fine Art also represents contemporary artists Dennis Doheny, Cindy Baron, Deladier Almeida, and Alexandra Averbach.

California impressionism and California plein-air painting
William A. Karges Fine Art specializes most notably in California Impressionism and California Plein-Air Painting. Considered to be a regional variation on American Impressionism, the terms describe the large movement of 20th century artists who worked out of doors (en plein air), directly from nature in California, United States. Their work became popular in the San Francisco Bay Area and Southern California in the first three decades after the turn of the 20th century.

Most of the Plein Air painters came from the East and Midwest in the US, and Europe, and only a few of the early artists such as Guy Rose (1867–1925) were actually born and raised in California. Some of the most prominent names associated with the Plein-Air school are the aforementioned Rose, William Wendt (1865–1946), Granville Redmond (1871–1935), Edgar Payne, Armin Hansen (1886–1957), Jean Mannheim (1861–1945), John Marshall Gamble (1863–1957), Franz Bischoff (1864–1929), William Ritschel (1864–1949), Alson S. Clark (1876–1949), Hanson Puthuff (1875–1972), Marion Wachtel (1875–1954), and Jack Wilkinson Smith (1873–1949). Most of these artists were already trained in art when they moved to California, arriving between 1900 and the early 1920s.

Dennis Doheny
William A. Karges Fine Art is the representative of Dennis Doheny. He is the most prominent living painter represented by the gallery.

Doheny was born and raised in the Los Angeles area and currently resides in Santa Barbara. He is a third generation Californian who grew up with an innate love of art and spent much of his childhood drawing and painting. Doheny is largely self-taught. After graduating from high school  in 1974, he exhibited with Petersen Gallery of Beverly Hills. From 1986 until 1996, Doheny supported his family with a steady career in commercial art until his return to landscape painting in 1997. Since 1997, his fine art career has developed a strong following both locally and nationally, with collectors drawn to his renderings of western landscapes, the Sierra Mountains, and the California coastline.

Doheny is the recipient of numerous awards. Most recently he was awarded with the Irvine Museum Gold Medal at the California Art Club's 2013 Exhibition at the USC Fisher Museum of Art. At the same Exhibition he received the American Art Collector Award of Excellence. In 2009 Doheny was chosen for the Edgar Payne Award for best landscape at the California Art Club's 2009 Gold Medal Juried Exhibition.  Dennis is featured in the Prix de West Invitational Art Exhibition from which he has received the Frederic Remington Award given in recognition of exceptional artistic merit at his first showing in 2006 and in 2008. In 2006 he received the Inaugural Purchase Prize at the Eiteljorg Museum's Quest for the West Exhibition.  In 2003 he was recognized by the Autry National Center and awarded the Master's of the American West Award. His painting was acquired by the museum for its permanent collection.  He also received the Granville Redmond Memorial Purchase Prize in 2000 for his painting New Dawn at the California Art Club's Spring Salon.  He received first place in the Carmel Plein Air Competition. Doheny is also a Signature Member of the California Art Club. Jean Stern, Director of the Irvine Museum, has written, “many say [he] is destined to be the seminal American landscape artist of the early 21st century.”

Notable exhibitions and publications
The gallery has released extensive catalogues in conjunction with notable exhibitions on artists including Ross Dickinson, The Early Works (1993); Jesse Arms Botke, Birds, Boughs, and Blossoms (1995); Rinaldo Cuneo, An Evolution of Style (1991); and Clyde Scott, Clyde Scott: Paintings From the Robert and Rea Westenhaver Collection (1999). The exhibition program has also featured multiple solo shows for contemporary painter Dennis Doheny.

Artists represented

William A. Karges Fine Art also represents of the estates of:

J.A. Botke
Cornelis Botke 
Rinaldo Cuneo
Ross Dickinson

References

1987 establishments in California
Art galleries established in 1987
Art museums and galleries in California
Contemporary art galleries in the United States
Carmel-by-the-Sea, California